Richard Carlson may refer to:

 Richard Carlson (actor) (1912–1977), American film and television actor
 Richard Carlson (author) (1961–2006), American author, psychotherapist, and motivational speaker
 Richard Carlson (politician), American politician serving in the Kansas House of Representatives
 Rich Carlson (21st century), American game developer and founder of Digital Eel
 Dick Carlson (Richard Warner Carlson, born 1941), former American journalist